IRMS may refer to:

Information and Records Management Society
Isotope ratio mass spectrometry
Integrated Risk Management Services
Information Request Management System